Maria Teuntje "Ria" van Velsen (born 18 May 1939) is a retired Dutch artistic gymnast who participated in the 1960 Summer Olympics. She took part in all events, with the best achievement of 14th place in the team all-around competitions. She is not related to the Dutch swimmer Ria van Velsen who also competed at the 1960 Games. After marriage to Thijs Rietveld in 1961 she was often credited as Ria Rietveld.

References

1939 births
Living people
Dutch female artistic gymnasts
Olympic gymnasts of the Netherlands
Gymnasts at the 1960 Summer Olympics
People from Bodegraven
Sportspeople from South Holland